Hokejový Klub Nitra is a professional ice hockey club based in Nitra, Slovakia. The club has been a member of the Slovak Extraliga since the 2003–04 season and winner of Slovak Extraliga in the 2015–16 season.

History
The club was founded in 1931 under the name AC. Their first trophy which they won was the Tatra Cup in 1934. The club was renamed several times; from 1945 to 1976 they were named Sokol, Komunálny podnik, Spojené závody, Slavoj, Slovan, and Štart. 

In 1976 the club was renamed Plastika Nitra. They won the 1. SNHL (1st Slovak National Hockey League), the second level of Czechoslovak hockey, in the 1983–84 season and clinched participation in the preliminary round for the Czechoslovak Extraliga. There they earned 2 points in 4 games against Škoda Plzeň and Poldi Kladno and did not qualify for the Extraliga. Nitra won the 1. SNHL in the 1986–87 season but in the preliminary round they lost against Poldi Kladno. In the next season they triumphed in the 1. SNHL again, but in the preliminary round they were defeated by TJ Vítkovice. Nitra's first promotion to the Czechoslovak Extraliga came in the 1989–90 season when they finished 4th in the qualification group and clinched participation at the Extraliga for the next season. Nitra finished 13th in their first Extraliga season, earning 39 points in 53 games and were relegated to the 1. SNHL. They won the next season of the 1. SNHL but were defeated by ŠKP Poprad in the preliminary round. In the 1991-92 season they won the 1. SNHL again, but the preliminary round was not played due to the dissolution of Czechoslovakia. 

Nitra won its first Slovak Extraliga title in the 2015–16 season. In the quarterfinal against MsHK Žilina, Nitra swept the series 4-0. In the semifinal they played seven games to beat HKm Zvolen. The final opponent was HC '05 Banská Bystrica, whom Nitra defeated 4–2 in the series to win the league title.

Honours

Domestic

Slovak Extraliga
  Winners (1): 2015–16
  Runners-up (4): 2013–14, 2016–17, 2018–19, 2021–22
  3rd place (4): 2005–06, 2012–13, 2014–15, 2017–18

Slovak 1. Liga
  Winners (1): 2002–03
  Runners-up (1): 2000–01

1st. Slovak National Hockey League
  Winners (5): 1983–84, 1986–87, 1987–88, 1991–92, 1992–93
  Runners-up (4): 1978–79, 1982–83, 1988–89, 1989–90
  3rd place (2): 1979–80, 1980–81

International
IIHF Continental Cup
  Winners (1): 2022–23

Pre-season
Tatra Cup
  Winners (1): 1933/1934

Rona Cup
  Winners (1): 2010

Players

Current roster

References

External links
 Official club website 

Nitra, HK Ardo
Nitra, HK Ardo
Sport in Nitra
Ice hockey clubs established in 1931
1931 establishments in Czechoslovakia